In boxing, bobbing and weaving is a defensive technique that moves the head both beneath and laterally of an incoming punch. As the opponent's punch arrives, the fighter bends the legs quickly and simultaneously shifts the body either slightly right or left. Fighters generally begin weaving to the left, as most opponents are orthodox stance, and therefore strike with a left jab first. Common mistakes made with this move include bending at the waist, bending too low, moving in the same direction as the incoming punch, and squaring up.

Popular usage
The oft-heard catchphrase of Finance & Commerce reporter Bill Clements. (Example: "How're you doing?" "Oh, you know, bobbin' and weavin'.")

Notable bob and weave boxers

 Joe Frazier
 Bennie Briscoe
 Jack Dempsey
 Rocky Graziano
 Rocky Marciano
 Floyd Mayweather Jr.
 Archie Moore
 Floyd Patterson
 Aaron Pryor
 Salvador Sánchez
 James Toney
 José Torres
 David Tua
 Mike Tyson

See also
 Slipping

References

Boxing terminology
Kickboxing terminology
Punches (combat)